The 2015 Bangladesh Premier League, also known as BPL 3 or BRB Cables BPL 2015 (for sponsorship reasons), was the third season of the Bangladesh Premier League (BPL), a twenty20 cricket league established by the Bangladesh Cricket Board in 2012. The tournament featured six teams during the third season. The season began on Friday, 20 November  2015, with a lavish opening ceremony held at Sher-e-Bangla National Cricket Stadium in Dhaka, and the annual kickoff game was held between Chittagong Vikings and Rangpur Riders, which resulted with the Rangpur winning by two wickets in last ball finish.

The championship game was held on 15 December 2015, in which Comilla Victorians won the championship by defeating Barisal Bulls by three wickets. Alok Kapali from Comilla Victorians was awarded player of the match in the final for his match winning 39 from 28 balls. Ashar Zaidi was awarded the player of the tournament for his all rounding performance of 215 runs and 17 wickets throughout the tournament. Ashar Zaidi of Comilla Victorians was named Most valuable player (MVP), while Abu Hider was the find of the tournament.

Players' draft

The draft was held on 22 October 2015 in Dhaka. Six franchises participated in the draft method. Players from Category A-D were picked in the draft by six teams. The icon players and platinum category players were excluded from the draft process. Chris Gayle was picked up by Barisal Bulls for 1.65 crores (US$210,000). Total 319 players took part in the draft process, and 82 players were drafted. The six icon players were selected through lottery process.

Opening Ceremony 
The third season of the tournament was officially launched at the  Sher-e-Bangla National Cricket Stadium in Mirpur on 20 November 2015. During the opening ceremony, All six teams, along with their owners and captains were introduced. The opening ceremony featured live performances from Chirkutt Band, Ayub Bachchu, Momtaz Begum, KK, Jacqueline Fernandez, and Hrithik Roshan. The total cost of the opening ceremony was reported to be 3.5 crores.

Venues 
A total of 34 matches including the championship game was held in two venues. The first and third leg of the tournament was played at Dhaka while the second leg was held at the port city Chittagong. Sher-e-Bangla National Cricket Stadium hosted 26 matches while Zahur Ahmed Chowdhury Stadium hosted the eight group stage matches.

Teams and standings 

 Top 4 teams qualifies for the playoffs
  advanced to the Qualifier
  advanced to the Eliminator

Squads

League progression

Matches

Phase 1

Phase 2

Phase 3

Playoffs

Qualifier 1

Eliminator

Qualifier 2

Final

Statistics

Most runs

Most wickets

Highest team totals
The following table lists the five highest team scores during this season.

References

External links
Official website
BPL 2016 Player list, Start Date, Schedule, New Teams and venue

Bangladesh Premier League
Bangladesh Premier League
2015 Bangladesh Premier League
2015 in Bangladeshi cricket
Bangladesh Premier League seasons
Bangladesh Premier League
2016 in Bangladeshi cricket